The Geregu nuclear power plant is a twin-reactor nuclear power plant planned in Nigeria. The project foresees construction of two nuclear reactors supplied by Atomstroyexport and the plant would be located in Geregu, Kogi State.

It is part of efforts to find solution to the shortage of power supply in the country. According to World Bank, more than 40% of the country was without electricity in 2014.

The Nigeria Atomic Energy Commission (NAEC) explained that  the site had been selected for the construction of two nuclear reactors after due considerations. Preliminary licensing of the approved site is expected by the end of 2016 from the Nigerian Nuclear Regulatory Authority (NNRA) which has started the process of developing the license.

On 30 October 2017, Russia’s state-owned Rosatom and Nigeria have signed agreements for the construction and operation of the nuclear power plant.

The plant would be co-financed by Rosatom, which will build, own, operate and transfer (BOT) it to the Nigerian government. The estimate cost is about $10 billion.

In October 2022, Geregu became the first power company to list on Nigeria's Stock Exchange.

References

Proposed nuclear power stations
Nuclear power in Nigeria
Nuclear power stations using VVER reactors
Proposed power stations in Nigeria